The Hall-Harding-McCampbell House is a former plantation and historic mansion in Nashville, Tennessee. It has been listed on the National Register of Historic Places since March 23, 2010.

History
The land, located near Stones River, was claimed by William Moore in 1784. In 1799, he sold it to Charles Merryman Hall. His brother, William Hall, purchased 249 acres of the land from Charles in 1800.

The house was built circa 1805 for William Hall, and it was designed in the Federal architectural style. Hall, his wife, his son and his daughter lived here with his forty slaves until 1820. It was purchased by Thomas Harding, who acquired up to 1,000 acres by 1847. James Anderson purchased the plantation in 1847, and he sold 200 acres and the house to Thomas McCampbell in 1852. McCampbell lived here with his wife, Anna Gowdey Campbell, and their five children. Their son John Campbell inherited the house in 1875, and the house stayed in the family until the 1940s.

References

Houses on the National Register of Historic Places in Tennessee
Houses completed in 1804
Houses in Nashville, Tennessee
Federal architecture in Tennessee
Plantation houses in Tennessee